Mixtla (municipality) is a town and municipality in Puebla in south-eastern Mexico.

As of April 2, 2021, Mixtla had presented two confirmed cases but no deaths related to the COVID-19 pandemic in Mexico.

The dismembered body of former municipal president Altamirano Gonzalo Elías Zopiyactle (2005-2007), 48, was found with a narco-message from "Miauuu" on April 2, 2021 in Zongolica along Mexican Federal Highway 123.found last Friday in Zongolica belongs to the former mayor of Mixtla, both territories of Veracruz.

References

Municipalities of Puebla